Ersin Demir (born 8 December 1977 in Cologne) is a Turkish football coach and former player, who most recently was the manager of FC Ingolstadt 04 II.

He last played for FC Ingolstadt 04 II.

Personal life
He also holds German citizenship.

References

1977 births
Living people
Turkish footballers
Association football forwards
2. Bundesliga players
3. Liga players
Bayer 04 Leverkusen II players
Alemannia Aachen players
Samsunspor footballers
Chemnitzer FC players
FC Augsburg players
FC Erzgebirge Aue players
FC Ingolstadt 04 players
FC Ingolstadt 04 II players
German people of Turkish descent
Footballers from Cologne